The 2001–02 season was the 33rd campaign of the Scottish Men's National League, the national basketball league of Scotland. The season featured 9 teams; from the previous season Glasgow Storm joined the league, and long-standing members Midlothian Bulls and Paisley did not return. Troon Tornadoes won their first league title.

Teams

The line-up for the 2001–02 season featured the following teams:

Aberdeen Buccaneers
Boroughmuir
City of Edinburgh Kings
Clark Erikkson Fury
Dunfermline Reign
Glasgow d2
Glasgow Storm
St Mirren McDonalds
Troon Tornadoes

League table

 Source: Scottish National League 2001-02 - Britball

References

Scottish Basketball Championship Men seasons
basketball
basketball